Cania heppneri is a moth of the family Limacodidae. It is found in Taiwan.

References

Moths described in 1992
Limacodidae
Moths of Asia